Craig Balsam is an American entertainment industry entrepreneur, Tony Award-winning theatrical producer and film producer. He is co-founder of the New York City-based independent music company Razor & Tie as well as the children’s music brand Kidz Bop.

Career

Razor & Tie 
After earning a juris doctor degree at School of Law and practicing in New York corporate firms in the late 1990s, Balsam and his friend Cliff Chenfeld co-founded an independent music company.  Named for the required uniform of the lucrative profession that they left behind, Razor & Tie went on to sell over 40 million units, generate billions of streams and win multiple Grammy Awards.  Balsam and Palden owned and operated indie Razor & Tie for almost 30 years and completed a sale of the business in late 2018 to Concord Music.

During that 30-year period, Razor & Tie became one of the largest privately-owned labels and publishing companies in North America. The label’s first release in 1990, a nostalgic compilation titled “The 70s Preservation Society Presents Those Fabulous 70s,” proved a multi-million-selling blockbuster and was followed by a series of hugely popular music compilations and DVDs, including “Disco Fever,” “Totally 80s,” “Monsters of Rock,” “Monster Ballads,” “Darrin’s Dance Grooves” and many others. The unprecedented success of these and other compilations and the creation of its own in-house media buying business (Razor & Tie Media) created one of the largest independent direct response music companies in the United States.

In the early 90s, Razor & Tie began a reissue label, releasing on CD hundreds of classic albums and career retrospectives by a range of landmark artists, including Glen Campbell, King Curtis, the Partridge Family, Don Covay, James Carr, Merle Haggard, among many others. In ensuing years, an eclectic roster of artists were signed to the label’s new music division, including such icons as Jon Batiste, The Pretty Reckless, Joan Baez, Graham Parker, Marshall Crenshaw, Dar Williams, All That Remains, and Brand New. In 2014, Razor & Tie launched the Washington Square imprint, showcasing a number of indie and alternative artists.

Razor & Tie Music Publishing launched in 2007, a songwriter-friendly and service-oriented division with an aggressive approach to multi-media song placement, royalty administration and artist and writer career development — Razor & Tie Publishing quickly became a successful indie music publisher with number one hits across several genres and a robust synch business.

Kidz Bop 
In 2001, Balsam co-founded, with Chenfeld, the #1 children’s music brand KIDZ BOP, featuring today’s biggest pop hits "sung by kids for kids." The children's music phenomenon has sold tens of millions of albums and generated billions of streams since its debut in 2001, with several successful nationwide Kidz Bop Live shows along the way. The best-selling series has had 24 Top 10 debuts on the Billboard 200; only three artists in history—The Beatles, The Rolling Stones and Barbra Streisand—have had more Top 10 albums and KIDZ BOP was named Billboard's "#1 Kids' Artist" for eight consecutive years.

Theater and film production 
Balsam has served as co-producer on a number of theatrical productions, including the 2019 Tony Award-winner for “Best Musical,” Hadestown, and playwright-actor Heidi Schreck’s Tony Award-nominated What the Constitution Means to Me, a finalist for the 2019 Pulitzer Prize for Drama and winner of the New York Drama Critics' Circle  “Best American Play” of 2019. In 2020, Balsam was a lead producer presenting the first Broadway production of Martin McDonagh’s Hangmen, which won the 2016 Olivier Award for “Best New Play."

Balsam has also served as executive producer on a number of films, including 2009’s Joan Baez: How Sweet The Sound, a comprehensive documentary produced in association with WNET for PBS’ American Masters series, 2014’s musical romantic comedy-drama The Last Five Years, co-starring Anna Kendrick and Jeremy Jordan, and 2016’s Women Who Kill.

Personal life 
Balsam was born in Newark, New Jersey and grew up in Millburn, New Jersey. He has a BA from Emory University and a JD from NYU School of Law.  He and his wife Jodi Balsam, an Associate Professor of Clinical Law and Director of Externship Programs at Brooklyn Law School, live in Manhattan and have three grown children.

References 

Year of birth missing (living people)
Living people
American company founders
New York University School of Law alumni
Emory University alumni
People from Millburn, New Jersey
People from Newark, New Jersey